The 28th Awit Awards were held at Music Museum in Greenhills, San Juan. They honored the best of Filipino music for the year 2014. It was originally scheduled on August 25, 2015 but due to unforeseen technical problems and inclement weather brought by Typhoon Ineng, it was postponed to December 9, 2015.

Winners and nominees
Winners are listed first and highlighted in bold. Nominated producers, composers and lyricists are not included in this list, unless noted. For the full list, please go to their official website.

Performance Awards

Awit Awards
2015 music awards
2015 in Philippine music